Xenomystax atrarius, the deepwater conger or twinpored eel, is an eel in the family Congridae (conger/garden eels). It was described by Charles Henry Gilbert in 1891. It is a marine, deep water-dwelling eel which is known from southern Canada to Chile, in the eastern Pacific Ocean. It dwells at a depth range of 165–935 metres. Males can reach a maximum total length of 100 centimetres.

References

Congridae
Fish described in 1891